Kimberley Lynton "Kim" Williams  (born 1952) is an Australian media executive and composer. He has headed a wide range of prominent organisations such as Musica Viva Australia, Foxtel, the Australian Film Commission, the Sydney Opera House Trust and News Limited (now News Corp Australia).

Family and early life
Williams was born in Sydney to Joan and David Williams AM (1925–2009). His father was managing director of the Greater Union Organisation and recipient of the Australian Film Institute's Raymond Longford Award. Candice, his sister, is married to the cellist Nathan Waks. He attended schools in West Ryde (Marsden High School where Richard Gill was his music teacher) and Ermington. During his youth he was an Australian Lego champion.

Musical education and achievements
He studied the clarinet, and had tuition from Donald Westlake at the Sydney Conservatorium of Music. He won a Commonwealth scholarship to the University of Sydney, choosing to study music. He also had private lessons with Peter Sculthorpe in 1969. He was invited by Donald Peart, inaugural Professor of Music at the University of Sydney, to be the concert organiser of the International Society for Contemporary Music.

He composed music from an early age and into his 30s and his compositions include:
 Chamber Concerto for clarinet and small orchestra (1969)
 Sonata II for clarinet and 2 pianos (1969)
 The Three Candles for small orchestra (1969)
 Music for Flautist (1970)
 Fun Music I for beginner's orchestra (1971)
 Music of Space (1971), for clarinet, 2 percussionists and 6 loudspeakers
 Song of Kathy (1972)
 World Music (1972)
 Portrait for clarinet and piano trio (1975; commissioned by Musica Viva Australia, premiered Canberra 27 May 1975, performed Sydney Opera House 8 September by Gabor Reeves, Ladislav Jasek, Nathan Waks and Romola Costantino)
 Forever and a Day, for harp and chamber string orchestra (1976).

Vietnam War
Williams was a conscientious objector during the Vietnam War, defending himself in court. His impending imprisonment was averted when the incoming Whitlam Labor government abolished national service in late 1972.

Working life
After graduation, Williams had a series of management roles in music: in opera; at the Sydney Conservatorium under Rex Hobcroft; as a member of the inaugural Australia Council Music Board (1973); and general manager of Music Rostrum Australia, whose artistic director was Roger Woodward. Between 1975 and 1977, he studied composition in Italy with Luciano Berio and was assistant to Berio's ex-wife, the American soprano Cathy Berberian. He also had significant involvement with the Israel Chamber Orchestra. On return to Australia he became general manager (1977–84) and later board member and chairman (1984–2004) of Musica Viva Australia.

Williams was then CEO of the Australian Film Commission, he ran the TV production house Southern Star Group, and became a senior executive at the Australian Broadcasting Corporation (ABC). In 1988, he was appointed Foundation Chairman of Film Finance Corporation Australia.

In 1995, shortly after the last-minute failure of a deal for the ABC to provide two news channels to Rupert Murdoch's Foxtel, which Williams had spearheaded on behalf of the ABC, he left the ABC to accept Murdoch's invitation to head Fox Studios. In December 2001 he became Chief Executive of Foxtel. He remained until 2011 and was praised for reversing Foxtel's fortunes from a chronic loss-maker to high-profitability. He was a participant in the Australia 2020 Summit, as a member of the Towards a Creative Australia working group.

Williams was Chairman of the Sydney Opera House Trust from 2005, on the invitation of the then Premier of New South Wales Bob Carr, until stepping down in 2013. In 2006 he was canvassed as a potential successor to Russell Balding, after Balding resigned as managing director of the ABC.

In December 2011, Williams was appointed CEO of News Limited (which became News Corp Australia in July 2013). He resigned in August 2013 amid reports that his management style had alienated many staff members and executives, including members of the Murdoch family. In February 2014 he was appointed a Commissioner of the Australian Football League (AFL). The same year he published Rules of Engagement, an account of his time in Australia's leading boardrooms and organisations.

Williams was appointed an independent board member of the Copyright Agency Limited in January 2015 and has been its Chair since June 2015.

In 2016 Williams was appointed Chairman of the State Library of New South Wales Foundation Board.

Personal
Williams married twice: from 1983–1989 to Kathy Lette, and since 1998 to Catherine Dovey, daughter of Gough and Margaret Whitlam (née Dovey), and Kathy Lette's best friend. He and Dovey have endowed the Williams/Dovey Scholarship at the Centre for Social Impact.

In 2011, he established the David and Joan Williams Documentary Fellowship in honour of his late parents.

In November 2013, he was invited by the Garvan Institute of Medical Research to become one of the first Australians to have his personal genome sequenced.

Honours
 In 2006 he was appointed a Member of the Order of Australia (AM), "for service to arts administration through executive roles with a range of cultural organisations, to music education and the formulation of arts related public policy".
 In 2009 he was awarded an Honorary Doctorate of Letters by Macquarie University for his contribution to the arts and entertainment industry both in Australia and internationally.
 In 2010 he was Deakin University's George Fairfax Fellow in Arts and Entertainment Management.
 In 2010 he gave the Ken Myer Lecture, titled "Growing up in Arts – a personal Australian perspective on film, television, music and management".
 In 2017 he gave the Peggy Glanville-Hicks Address.

References

1952 births
Living people
Members of the Order of Australia
Australian newspaper publishers (people)
University of Sydney alumni
Australian male composers
Australian composers
Australian memoirists
Australian film studio executives
Australian conscientious objectors